Archiargiolestes is a genus of damselflies in the family Megapodagrionidae.
Species of Archiargiolestes are small, black metallic damselflies with pale markings, endemic to south-western Australia,
where they inhabit swampy areas.

Species 
The genus Archiargiolestes includes the following species:

Archiargiolestes parvulus  - Midget flatwing
Archiargiolestes pusillissimus  - tiny flatwing
Archiargiolestes pusillus  - little flatwing

See also
 List of Odonata species of Australia

References

Megapodagrionidae
Zygoptera genera
Odonata of Australia
Endemic fauna of Australia
Taxa named by Clarence Hamilton Kennedy
Insects described in 1925
Damselflies